Murder 101 (also stylized as Murder101 and known under the working title of C.L.A.S.S.) is an American horror film that was directed by Michael Phillip Edwards. The film was released to DVD on June 10, 2014 and had a limited theatrical release on June 13, 2014. It stars Tom Sizemore and Paige LaPierre, and follows a female law student that gets caught up in a twisted game of cat and mouse. Filming took place in Los Angeles, California during 2010.

Synopsis 
Fiona (Paige LaPierre) is a beautiful and highly intelligent young law student that is eager to take on her latest class, a course in criminology by Professor Mark Sloan (Randy Irwin). She's horror-struck when a series of brutal and seemingly random slayings begin around the campus community, leading Detective Caterson (Sheldon F. Robins) to suspect that it's the work of a mass murderer. Unwilling to watch the deaths keep piling up without doing anything, Fiona decides to investigate the murders- a decision made partially due to fact that her own father died at the hands of a mass murderer that was never caught or identified. However, as the murders increase Fiona finds that the victims are closely connected to her life and her past, leading her to suspect that someone close to her is the killer.

Cast
 Tom Sizemore as FBI Agent Ridley
 Paige LaPierre as Fiona
 Randy Irwin as Professor Sloan
 Jamison Haase as Chase
 Greg Winter as AP Bill Peele
 Sheldon F. Robins as Detective Caterson
 Katie Malia as Leslie
 Mike James as Walter
 Rai Moore as Cynda
 Michelle Cimmin as Gigi
 Dante Basco as Deon
 Dominica Westling as Kelly
 Sam Daly as Thomas Reid
 M.J. Karmi as Mrs. Reid

References

External links 
 
 

2014 films
Films shot in Los Angeles
2014 horror films
2014 horror thriller films
2010s English-language films